Odysseas Adam (born 18 February 1997) is a Greek volleyball player, a member of the club Foinikas Syros.

Sporting achievements

Clubs 
English Cup:
  2017
English Championship:
  2017
  2016
Greece Championship:
  2019

References

External links
 GreekVolley profile
 Volleybox profile
 Volleyball-Agency profile

1997 births
Living people
Greek men's volleyball players